Cnemidochroma lopesi is a species of beetle in the family Cerambycidae. It was described by S. A. Fragoso and Miguel A. Monné in 1989. It is known from central Brazil.

References

Callichromatini
Beetles described in 1989
Endemic fauna of Brazil